Petros Filippidis or Petros Philippidis (born 31 December 1962) is a Greek former actor. Filippidis has taken part in many ancient Greek comedies, such as Thesmophoriazusae and The Birds. He achieved widespread fame starring in 1993 Mega Channel's comedy television series High Rock along with actor Tasos Chalkias. Since then, he has taken part in numerous television series as well as in film productions. He is perhaps best known for starring in the Mega Channel production 50-50 with Ava Galanopoulou, Maria Androutsou, Pavlos Haikalis, Sakis Boulas, Vana Rambota and others.

In 1986, he graduated from the drama school of the Art Theatre Karolos Koun in Athens and studied at Athens Conservatoire thereafter he completed his stage direction studies at Stavrakos School.

After the 15th investigating magistrate of the Athens Court of First Instance was summoned Petros Filippidis to testify on 27 July 2021, he fully denied accusations against him, however he had not convinced the investigating magistrate and with the prosecutor's agreement Petros Filippidis was sentenced to pre-trial detention. On 27 July 2021 he was arrested and was escorted to the Attica General Police Directorate (GADA) where he detained and after he imprisoned on 28 July 2021 at Tripoli Prison on sexual harassment charges, rape and attempted rape charges over incidents involving three different actresses, Penelope Anastasopoulou, Lena (Eleni) Drosaki, Anna-Maria Papaharalambous, among countless sexual assault allegations were made. 
The Hellenic Actors’ Union (SEI) (the Greek Actors Guild) at its general session on 10 April 2022 has unanimously decided the lifelong removal of Petros Filippidis from its registry of members. 

Petros Filippidis has declined to publicly interview or discuss the charges against him. Michalis Dimitrakopoulos, the defense lawyer representing Petros Filippidis, spoke out to Mega TV’s Hamogela kai Pali program on 3 October 2021 stated: "Consciously mister Filippidis has decided that not being applied with reports the case. He will speak at the court. Petros Filippidis does not intend to file criminal complaint nor a claim before a court against women who accuse him. His position is that is innocent and will try to prove his innocence." Petros Filippidis released on 1 July 2022 on conditions.

Me Too

The wave of #MeToo that took off in Greece, inspired a number of actresses and actors in the Arts and Entertainment sector to come forward with their own stories of workplace bullying, sexual harassment and abuse, with reports surfacing about Filippidis' involvement in such cases. Following these revelations, Filippidis was removed from the TV programs he was starring.

Filippidis has been accused of raping a female actress twice in 2008 and attempting to rape another two actresses in 2010 and 2014. The victims of the two attempted rapes claim that when Filippidis did not get what he wanted, he resorted to physical violence and threatened to harm their careers. Prosecuting authorities have referred to "long periods of activity from 2008 to 2014," during which he took advantage of his position and "exercised power to commit acts violating the sexual dignity of his victims."

He was charged on sexual harassment charges and he was imprisoned on 28 July 2021.

Trial 2022-2023 
The trial of Petros Filippidis was scheduled to begin on 18 March 2022 but was adjourned until 28 March 2022 due to he did not appear in court citing himself health reasons. Filippidis had been present at the trial on 28 March 2022 where the first woman who accused him of rape testified. The trial continued further on 1 April 2022 at Mixed Jury Court of Athens with the examination of the first woman who accused him of rape repeatedly.

On 16 May 2022 testified the second woman who accused Petros Filippidis of attempted rape in 2010 in his dressing room at the Mousouri Theatre in Athens that then was hosting the theatrical play Mpakalogatos. She continued her testimony on 17 May 2022. The trial was continued on 25 May 2022. He released on 1 July 2022, after he has been in custody since July 2021, on conditions that he banned from leaving the country, must appear at his local police precinct twice a month and a bail payment at 20.000 euros. The reasoning that is he is no longer considered a threat to commit the same crimes.  
The trial continued. Due to the scheduled holiday time off of the Greek courts the trial continued on 1 September 2022. On 13 September 2022 the Hellenic Actors’ Union (SEI) president Spyros Mpimpilas testified at the court and called Petros Filippidis to apologize to his victims referring that Petros Filippidis, after the first complains, he asked from him to prevent a woman to proceed with a complaint against him. On 14 September 2022 Spyros Mpimpilas continued his testimony. The trial continued on 4 October 2022, where a female journalist testified:They were told me you're fired because you're going to testify in favour of Filippidis. After a summons made by the court, they testified at the trial, Tasos Chalkias, Alina Kotsovoulou, Zeta Makripoulia, Thaleia Matika, Rania Schiza. 

On 22 November 2022 testified at the trial actresses Tzouli Souma and Andromahi Davlou who mentioned about everything she experienced in 2000. Referring to the actress Lena Drosaki who and Petros Filippidis were participating at the play Murder on the Orient Express at Theatre Katia Dandoulaki, actress Katia Dandoulaki on her deposition testimony at trial on 24 November 2022 she told about "he had developed one obsession with her" and "everyone would be found trouble when being defended her or being talked with her."     
 
On 24 November 2022 deposed at the trial, an executive member of the private broadcaster ANT1 TV, who, as she declared, in 2016 collaborated with Petros Filippidis on AΝΤ1’s Your Face Sounds Familiar, testified that she experienced sexual harassment two times from Petros Filippidis, also that he had made a phone video call to her while he being naked from the waist down touching his penis. For the incident she has then informed there manager Tzoni Kalimeris what happened. In addition, she testified that Petros Filippidis started telephone calling her again in 2019 and asked her to meet. Later, actress Lena Drosaki testified that Petros Filippidis often called her on her phone and made obscene sexual conversations with her, she testified "I understood he was masturbating, I was asking «Who is it, who is it?» and he answered «Petros». The days came when I would take part on the examinations at theatre. I was sitting on the steps of the theatre and I saw him in front of me and he said: «If you do not sit me [do sexual act], then you will not pass». Leaving from the theatre I remember that his move that is like saying that «Ι told you, I have this power not to let you pass». I did not pass." She continued her testimony on 25 November 2022. On 5 December 2022 testified at the trial actress Evelina Papoulia who told for Petros Filippidis "I was on stage of theatre and he was pulling down his trousers demonstrating his genitals," and "he grabs me by the waist, and he went to grope me". After she proposed herself, on 19 December 2022 she testified at the trial actress Viky Protogeraki. On 9 January 2023 Petros Filippidis began his deposition at trial. 

On 13 January 2023, Mixed Jury Court of Athens Prosecutor Stella Stoya proposed Petros Filippidis be charged with two counts of attempted rape and be acquitted regarding the complaint of rape. On 8 February 2023 the court announced its verdict unanimously in the trial acquitted Petros Filippidis on a single felony of serial rape charge, and was found guilty of two charges of attempted rape. Petros Filippidis heard the court’s decision with his wife Elpida Ninou and son Dimitris Filippidis by his side. The actresses Penelope Anastasopoulou, Lena Drosaki, Anna-Maria Papaharalambous, Andromahi Davlou and Zeta (Georgia) Douka were also in court.

Controversies  
Michalis Dimitrakopoulos, the defense lawyer representing Petros Filippidis, speaking to the Alpha TV’s Super Katerina program on 10 February 2023 announces Petros Filippidis has ordered from the law office of Michalis Dimitrakopoulos to be filed a claim before a court against actress Penelope Anastasopoulou on 13 February 2023, contrary to what Michalis Dimitrakopoulos had said to Mega TV’s Hamogela kai Pali program on 3 October 2021 stated: "Consciously mister Filippidis has decided that not being applied with reports the case. He will speak at the court. Petros Filippidis does not intend to file criminal complaint  nor a claim before a court against women who accuse him. His position is that is innocent and will try to prove his innocence."

References

External links
 

1963 births
Living people
20th-century Greek male actors
21st-century Greek male actors
People charged with rape
Greek prisoners and detainees
Greek male comedians
Greek male film actors
Greek male stage actors
Greek male television actors
Greek male voice actors
Male actors from Athens